Kris 'Chetan' Ramlu (Hindi: चेतन रामलु), is a New Zealand musician of Indian origin (Telugu descent from Andhra Pradesh, India).  Though his main instrument is the tabla (a pair of tuned hand drums from India), Chetan plays many other instruments and has learnt classical singing with some of the Indian masters.  His biggest musical influence is Ustad Zakir Hussain, a virtuoso percussionist whose name is synonymous with the tabla.

Early life
Chetan started playing the tabla at the age of 10 and was performing at concerts by the age of 12. He was trained by his father for many years and was later taught by his ustaad, Muhammad Sardar Khan of Hyderabad. He has also trained in the art of Indian classical singing with ghazal maestro Pandit Vithal Rao and Rahat Ali, legendary harmonium player for Rizwan-Muazzam.

Career

More recently, Chetan has worked with many western and Indian artists, including Vaishali Samant, Papon, Sajjad Ali, Anup Jalota, Rhian Sheehan, Harjeet Mehndi, Sangeet Mishra and Tahir Qawwal (Fanna-Fi-Allah).

Chetan has been on tour with Tahir Qawwal and Party since 2016.

External links

References 

1989 births
Musicians from Wellington
Tabla players
New Zealand people of Indian descent
Living people
21st-century drummers